"I Go to Extremes" is the fourth track on American singer Billy Joel's 11th studio album, Storm Front (1989). It was released as the second single from the album in 1989. It reached the number-six position on the US Billboard Hot 100 and peaked at number three on the Canadian RPM Top Singles chart. The song was also a top-10 hit on both the Billboard Adult Contemporary and Album Rock Tracks charts.

At one point considered a song about a manic-depressive, the song was originally written as an apology to Joel's wife at the time, Christie Brinkley. The B-side to the single was "When In Rome", which appeared on the same album. The music video consists of Joel and his backing band playing the song in a room. The song received a mostly positive response, and a live version appears on the album 2000 Years: The Millennium Concert. During live performances, Joel would often jokingly change the lyrics to the chorus, as well as to various lines in the song.

Writing and recording
The St. Paul Pioneer Press believes that the song chronicles the highs and lows of a "manic-depressive". However, according to Joel, the song is an apology that is directed to his then wife, Christie Brinkley. Joel was apologizing for his erratic personality. In live concerts, Joel would often jokingly create new lyrics for the chorus, such as "I go for ice cream", and "I got a new wife on the cover of Life." The song is believed to be about Joel's own lifestyle. The b-side to the single release was another song from the album, "When in Rome". The music video consists of Joel playing with musicians in a room.

Reception
The song reached the top ten in the US at number six and reached number 70 on the UK Singles Chart. A live version of the song appeared on his album, 2000 Years: The Millennium Concert.

Dennis Hunt of The Los Angeles Times believed the song was the highlight of the album, saying that it was the only song that wasn't "tainted by a social message." The Fresno Bee sarcastically says "Oh, Billy, stop it - you're just soooo extreme! Have your machine call my machine, and we'll do this extreme thing together." The Pittsburgh Post-Gazette said of the song, "I realized a lot of rock critics must have tin ears. Why else would they pan Billy Joel?" Jan DeKnock of The Chicago Tribune believed that the song was "another sure-fire winner from his [Joel's] "Storm Front" LP." Robb Frederick of The Daily Collegian believed that the song "shows remorse for a moodiness which almost reaches the degree of schizophrenia". John MCalley of Rolling Stone called the song "hard-driving", and thought the character in the song was "futilely [trying] to account to his girlfriend for his inconsistent moods and wavering confidence." The Miami Herald believed that the song had potential to be a "great" song, but was still disappointed. Stephen Thomas Erlewine of Allmusic believed that the song was one of the strongest songs of the album, also calling it "catchy." Matthew Bernstein of The Boston Globe believes that it's a great work-out song.

Personnel 
 Billy Joel – lead and backing vocals, acoustic piano, Hammond organ
 Jeff Jacobs – synthesizers 
 David Brown – guitars 
 Schuyler Deale – bass 
 Liberty DeVitto – drums 
 Mick Jones – backing vocals 
 Ian Lloyd – backing vocals 
 Joe Lynn Turner – backing vocals

Charts

Weekly charts

Year-end charts

Release history

References

1989 songs
1990 singles
Billy Joel songs
Columbia Records singles
Songs written by Billy Joel